Imamuzzaman Chowdhury is a retired Major General of Bangladesh Army who played a major role in preventing the 1996 Bangladesh coup d'état attempt.

Career
Chowdhury fought in the Bangladesh Liberation war as a lieutenant. He was awarded Bir Bikrom for his role in the war. 

Chowdhury served Principal Staff Officer to the Prime Minister of Bangladesh. He prevented the movement of mutinous soldiers towards Dhaka, which led to the failure of the 1996 Bangladesh coup d'état attempt. He retired from Bangladesh Army in 2001. 

Chowdhury was appointed the Chairman of Bangladesh Chemical Industries Corporation, a state owned enterprise, on 22 October 2003 on a three-year contract. It was during his tenure as chairman that 10-Truck Arms and Ammunition were recovered from the jetty of Chittagong Urea Fertilizer Limited, a subsidiary of Bangladesh Chemical Industries Corporation. He served as Chairman till November 2006 when the government dismissed him from service.

References

Living people
Bangladesh Army generals
Recipients of the Bir Bikrom
Mukti Bahini personnel
Year of birth missing (living people)